The 2014–15 Tampa Bay Lightning season was the 23rd season for the National Hockey League (NHL) franchise that was established on December 16, 1991.

Off-season

April
The off-season for the Tampa Bay Lightning began on April 22, 2014, when they were eliminated in a four-game sweep by the Montreal Canadiens. On May 6, 2014, the first off-season transaction involved the Lightning signing their highly touted goaltender Andrei Vasilevskiy to a three-year, entry level contract. Coming into the 2014–15 season, Vasilevskiy is rated as team's top goaltending prospect. On May 21, 2014, the Lightning signed 2012 draft pick defensemen Dylan Blujus to a three-year, entry level contract. Blujus had four goals and 30 points in 55 games with the North Bay Battalion of the Ontario Hockey League (OHL). He also had four goals and 10 points in 22 playoff games, while helping the Battalion reach the OHL finals.

May
On May 23, 2014, the Lightning announced the re-signing of Calder Memorial Trophy finalist Tyler Johnson to a three-year contract extension. Johnson had 24 goals, 26 assists and a plus-23 rating in 82 games. Johnson led all rookies in total playing time, and was used heavily on the penalty kill. Additionally, Johnson put up five shorthanded goals, which tied for the NHL lead. Johnson was also named to the NHL All-Rookie Team for the 2013–14 season.

June
On June 9, 2014, the Lightning announced the re-signing of co-Calder Trophy finalist Ondrej Palat to a three-year, $10 million contract extension. Palat had 23 goals and a team-high 59 points during the 2013–14 season. Among all NHL rookies, he ranked second in points and third in goals. Like Johnson, Palat was also named to the NHL All-Rookie Team for the 2013–14 season.

On June 25, 2014, the Lightning signed Ryan Callahan to a six-year, $34.8 million contract. Callahan was acquired by the team in the previous season in the trade that sent Martin St. Louis to the New York Rangers, along with acquiring what would become a first round pick in both the 2014 and 2015 NHL Entry Drafts. Callahan had six goals and five assists in 20 regular season games with the Lightning. On the same day, the Lighting elected to use their final compliance buyout on forward Ryan Malone. Malone had dealt with injury problems during his stint with the Lightning, and saw his numbers dip to five goals and ten assists in 57 games. Additionally, Malone was involved in an arrest for DUI and cocaine possession. The team continued its busy day by re-signing forward J. T. Brown to a two-year, one-way contract. Brown appeared in 63 games with the Lightning last season, scoring four goals and 19 points while averaging 13:02 in ice time per game. Brown also appeared in all four Stanley Cup playoff games in 2014, notching two assists.

On June 27, 2014, the Lightning announced the re-signing of Mark Barberio to one-year, one-way contract. Barberio skated in 49 games, recording five goals and 10 points during the 2013–14 season. He was tied for fourth in the NHL among rookie defensemen with a plus-10 rating. Barberio has appeared in 51 total games for the Lightning, and has recorded a plus or even rating in 40 of his career games. On the same day, the Lighting acquired defensemen Jason Garrison from the Vancouver Canucks in exchange for their second round draft pick (50th overall). In addition to Garrison, the Lightning received the rights to left winger Jeff Costello and the Canuck's seventh round pick in 2015. In 2013–14, Garrison had 33 points in 81 games, but saw his possession numbers fall under former Vancouver Canucks head coach John Tortorella.

On June 29, 2014, the Lightning pulled off a series of trades to free up salary cap and acquire several draft picks. First, the Lightning traded Teddy Purcell to the Edmonton Oilers for center Sam Gagner. Purcell played five seasons for Tampa Bay after being acquired from the Los Angeles Kings in March 2010. Purcell's breakout year was in 2011–12, when he had 24 goals and 41 assists, along with a great playoff run that saw the Lightning reach the Eastern Conference Final. However, in recent years, Purcell has been somewhat disappointing for the team in terms of production; over the past two seasons, he has had 23 goals combined. The Lightning then quickly flipped Sam Gagner and forward B. J. Crombeen to the Arizona Coyotes for a sixth round draft pick in 2015. The Lightning also had to retain one-third of Gagner's remaining salary ($1.6 million). Crombeen, a fourth-line grinder and fighter, had four goals and 14 assists in 99 games over two seasons in Tampa Bay. At midnight, on June 1, 2014, the Lightning traded forward Nate Thompson to the Anaheim Ducks in exchange for a fourth and sixth round pick in the 2015 Draft. As a depth player, Thompson had become a key contributor the past five seasons, including being one of team's top penalty killers. On the same day, the Lightning re-signed Syracuse Crunch captain Mike Angelidis to a one-year, two-way contract. Angelidis skated in 75 games with the Crunch, recording 12 goals and 33 points to go along with 161 penalty minutes. He ranked second on the Crunch in penalty minutes and fifth in points. Angelidis has played in 515 career American Hockey League (AHL) games with the Norfolk Admirals, Albany River Rats and Crunch, collecting 99 goals and 207 points to go with 1,079 penalty minutes. In 2012, he was a member of the Norfolk Admirals team that won the Calder Cup championship, skating in 18 games and recording a goal and six points.

July
After freeing up cap space (approximately $13 million), the Lightning looked to the start of free agency. On July 1, the Lightning inked defensemen Anton Stralman to a $22.5 million, five-year contract. Stralman had one goal and 13 assists last season with the New York Rangers, and had five assists in 25 playoff games. A few hours later, the Lightning signed forward Brian Boyle to a three-year contract. Both Stralman and Boyle helped the Rangers capture the Eastern Conference Championship, and reach the Stanley Cup Final last season. Later in day, the Lightning signed goaltender Evgeni Nabokov to a one-year contract. Nabokov will serve as backup to starting goalie Ben Bishop, after team elected not to qualify an offer to goalie Anders Lindback, who signed with the Dallas Stars. In 2013–14 with the New York Islanders, Nabokov posted a .905 save percentage as their starting goaltender.

On July 4, the Lightning announced the re-signing of defensemen Andrej Sustr to a one-year, one-way contract. Sustr appeared in 43 games with the Lightning last season, posting one goal and eight points to go along with 16 penalty minutes. Sustr made his Stanley Cup playoffs debut against the Montreal Canadiens in 2014, skating in three games. In addition, he played in 12 games with the Syracuse Crunch, recording a goal and three assists. In total, Sustr has appeared in 45 NHL games, all with the Lightning over the past two seasons, recording one goal and eight points.

On July 8, the Lightning signed free agent defensemen Matt Corrente to a one-year, two-way contract. He has appeared in 34 career NHL games, all with the New Jersey Devils, over parts of two seasons, posting six assists and 68 penalty minutes. He also appeared in two playoff games during the 2010 Stanley Cup playoffs. This signing provides some depth and experience for the Crunch in the coming season, which will have several first-year players on defense. On the same day, the Lightning re-signed forward Cody Kunyk to a one-year, two-way contract. Kunyk signed by the Lightning last season as an undrafted free agent. He made his NHL debut, logging 10:12 of ice time, on April 13 against the Washington Capitals. Kunyk skated in over four seasons for the University of Alaska Fairbanks, where he had 60 goals and 133 points.

On July 10, the Lightning signed free agent forward Jerome Samson to a one-year, two-way contract. Samson played in 68 games for the St. John's IceCaps last season. He had 27 goals with 56 points. Samson has played in 424 AHL games with 160 goals and 336 points. Samson has also played in 46 career NHL games, all with the Carolina Hurricanes, over parts of three seasons. Samson will likely serve as veteran forward depth for Tampa's AHL affiliate, the Syracuse Crunch. On the same day, the Lightning re-signed forward Brett Connolly to a one-year, two-way contract. Connolly has played in 11 games for the Lightning last season, and had one goal. He has played in 84 career NHL games, all with the Lightning over three seasons. During that time, he has earned six goals and 17 points. Connolly has played in 137 AHL games, earning 52 goals and 120 points. He appeared in 66 games with the Crunch last season, totaling 21 goals and 57 points.

On July 11, 2014, the Lightning signed Brenden Morrow to a one-year contract. Morrow recorded 13 goals and 25 points in 71 games with the St. Louis Blues last season. Over his career, he has skated in 921 career NHL games with the Dallas Stars, Pittsburgh Penguins and the Blues. He has 262 goals and 567 points with a plus-108 rating. The Lightning also announced the signing of Philippe Paradis to a one-year, two-way contract. Paradis played in 56 games for the Crunch last season. He had six goals and 15 points. He has played 166 career AHL games with 13 goals and 43 points. Later in the day, the Lightning announced the re-signing of forward Richard Panik to a one-year, two-way contract. Panik played in 50 games with the Lightning last season and had three goals with 13 points. Additionally, he skated in 13 games with Syracuse and had three goals and 11 points.

August
On August 2, the Lightning re-signed starting goaltender Ben Bishop to a two-year contract extension. Bishop had a breakout season with the Lightning last year, posting a 37–14–7 record in 63 games. He had a .924 save percentage and a 2.23 goals against average (GAA). He set the Tampa Bay single season records for victories, save percentage and GAA, and was nominated for the Vezina Trophy as the NHL's top goaltender. Bishop has played in 108 career NHL games with the Lightning, Ottawa Senators and St. Louis Blues. He has a career record of 55–31–11 with eight shutouts, and a .920 save percentage and a 2.40 GAA.

Training camp 
On September 16, the Lightning announced their initial training camp roster, which contained 64 players. Goalie Leland Irving had signed a PTO to participate in the camp as a goalie invitee. However, Irving elected to sign with Salavat Yulaev Ufa of the Kontinental Hockey League (KHL) instead of participating in camp. The Lightning invited goalie Peter Mannino in Irving's place. The training camp roster also contained 24 players who participated in the rookie tournament in Tennessee. Some of the notable prospects from that tournament were Jonathan Drouin, Kristers Gudlevskis, Slater Koekkoek and Andrei Vasilevskiy. The training camp roster this year also contains the free agents acquired over the summer, as well as the returning cast from last years strong regular season performance.

On September 18, during practice, forward Jonathan Drouin fell during practice sustaining an "upper body injury." The team did not consider the injury to be serious, and he was expected to undergo further evaluation the following Monday. Despite the injury, Drouin was expected to make the opening night roster with the team.

On September 21, the Lightning released right winger Cameron Maclise from his training camp invite. Two days later, the Lightning released Michael Aviani and Kodie Curran from their training invites. In addition, the Lightning reassigned four 2014 draft picks to their respective junior hockey clubs (Digiacinto, Point, Masin and Thomas). Two days later, the Lightning announced that forward Jonathan Drouin is expected to miss three-to-four weeks with a thumb fracture. Drouin will continue to skate on his own until he is cleared to resume practicing with the team again.

On September 27, the Lightning held their Fan Fest event. During the event, the team unveiled their new third jersey for the upcoming season. This design retained the "Bolts" word mark logo, but brought back black as the primary color. Around the same time, the Lightning reduced their training camp roster by six players. The group of players consisted of AHL veteran players, which included Syracuse Crunch captain Mike Angelidis. All six players would have to clear waivers before being assigned to the Crunch. Later in the day, 27 players were reassigned to Syracuse or to their junior hockey club. As well, Peter Mannino was released from his training camp tryout. Some of the notable players in the group demoted were Kristers Gudlevskis, Andrei Vasilevskiy and Slater Koekkoek. A few notable prospects remained on the roster, including Vladislav Namestnikov, Cedric Paquette, Jonathan Drouin and defenseman Luke Witkowski.

Standings

Schedule and results

Preseason

|- align="center" bgcolor="ccffcc"
| 1 || September 23 || Nashville Predators || 4–2 ||  || Vasilevskiy || Amalie Arena || 10,442 || 1–0–0 || 
|- align="center" bgcolor="ffcccc"
| 2 || September 25 || @ Nashville Predators || 0–1 ||  || Gudlevskis || Bridgestone Arena || 13,107 || 1–1–0 || 
|- align="center" bgcolor="ccffcc"
| 3 || September 26 || Dallas Stars || 6–3 ||  || Bishop || Amalie Arena || 13,635 || 2–1–0 || 
|- align="center" bgcolor="ccffcc"
| 4 || September 30 || @ Dallas Stars || 5–1 ||  || Bishop || American Airlines Center || 14,212 || 3–1–0 || 
|- align="center" bgcolor="ccffcc"
| 5 || October 2 || @ Florida Panthers || 3–0 ||  || Nabokov || BB&T Center || 2,859 || 4–1–0 || 
|- align="center" bgcolor="ccffcc"
| 6 || October 4 || Florida Panthers || 4–1 ||  || Bishop || Amalie Arena || 15,411 || 5–1–0 || 
|-

|-
| 2014 Preseason Schedule
|-
| Lightning score listed first;

Regular season

|- align="center" bgcolor="ccffcc"
| 1 || October 9 || Florida Panthers || 3–2 || OT || Bishop || Amalie Arena || 19,204 || 1–0–0 || 2 || 
|- align="center" bgcolor="B0C4DE"
| 2 || October 11 || Ottawa Senators || 2–3 || SO || Bishop || Amalie Arena || 19,204 || 1–0–1 || 3 || 
|- align="center" bgcolor="ccffcc"
| 3 || October 13 || Montreal Canadiens || 7–1 ||  || Bishop || Amalie Arena || 17,622 || 2–0–1 || 5 || 
|- align="center" bgcolor="ffcccc"
| 4 || October 14 || New Jersey Devils || 1–2 ||  || Nabokov || Amalie Arena || 18,064 || 2–1–1 || 5 || 
|- align="center" bgcolor="ccffcc"
| 5 || October 18 || @ Vancouver Canucks || 4–2 ||  || Bishop || Rogers Arena || 18,647 || 3–1–1 || 7 || 
|- align="center" bgcolor="ffcccc"
| 6 || October 20 || @ Edmonton Oilers || 2–3 ||  || Bishop || Rexall Place || 16,839 || 3–2–1 || 7 || 
|- align="center" bgcolor="ccffcc"
| 7 || October 21 || @ Calgary Flames || 2–1 || OT || Nabokov || Scotiabank Saddledome || 19,289 || 4–2–1 || 9 || 
|- align="center" bgcolor="ccffcc"
| 8 || October 24 || @ Winnipeg Jets || 4–2 ||  || Bishop || MTS Centre || 15,016 || 5–2–1 || 11 || 
|- align="center" bgcolor="ffcccc"
| 9 || October 25 || @ Minnesota Wild || 2–7 ||  || Nabokov || Xcel Energy Center || 18,884 || 5–3–1 || 11 || 
|- align="center" bgcolor="ccffcc"
| 10 || October 28 || Arizona Coyotes || 7–3 ||  || Bishop || Amalie Arena || 17,511 || 6–3–1 || 13 || 
|- align="center" bgcolor="ccffcc"
| 11 || October 30 || Philadelphia Flyers || 4–3 ||  || Bishop || Amalie Arena || 18,642 || 7–3–1 || 15 || 
|-

|- align="center" bgcolor="ccffcc"
| 12 || November 1 || Washington Capitals || 4–3 ||  || Bishop || Amalie Arena || 19,119 || 8–3–1 || 17 || 
|- align="center" bgcolor="ccffcc"
| 13 || November 6 || Calgary Flames || 5–2 ||  || Bishop || Amalie Arena || 18,276 || 9–3–1 || 19 || 
|- align="center" bgcolor="ccffcc"
| 14 || November 8 || @ Columbus Blue Jackets || 7–4 ||  || Nabokov || Nationwide Arena || 14,982 || 10–3–1 || 21 || 
|- align="center" bgcolor="ccffcc"
| 15 || November 9 || @ Detroit Red Wings || 4–3 || SO || Bishop || Joe Louis Arena || 20,027 || 11–3–1 || 23 || 
|- align="center" bgcolor="B0C4DE"
| 16 || November 11 || @ Chicago Blackhawks || 2–3 || SO || Bishop || United Center || 21,345 || 11–3–2 || 24 || 
|- align="center" bgcolor="ffcccc"
| 17 || November 13 || San Jose Sharks || 1–2 ||  || Bishop || Amalie Arena || 19,004 || 11–4–2 || 24 || 
|- align="center" bgcolor="ccffcc"
| 18 || November 15 || New York Islanders || 5–2 ||  || Bishop || Amalie Arena || 19,204 || 12–4–2 || 26 || 
|- align="center" bgcolor="ccffcc"
| 19 || November 17 || @ New York Rangers || 5–1 ||  || Bishop || Madison Square Garden || 18,006 || 13–4–2 || 28 || 
|- align="center" bgcolor="ffcccc"
| 20 || November 18 || @ New York Islanders || 2–5 ||  || Nabokov || Nassau Coliseum || 12,908 || 13–5–2 || 28 || 
|- align="center" bgcolor="ffcccc"
| 21 || November 20 || @ Toronto Maple Leafs || 2–5 ||  || Bishop || Air Canada Centre || 19,089 || 13–6–2 || 28 || 
|- align="center" bgcolor="ccffcc"
| 22 || November 22 || Minnesota Wild || 2–1 ||  || Bishop || Amalie Arena || 19,204 || 14–6–2 || 30 || 
|- align="center" bgcolor="ccffcc"
| 23 || November 26 || New York Rangers || 4–3 ||  || Bishop || Amalie Arena || 19,204 || 15–6–2 || 32 || 
|- align="center" bgcolor="ccffcc"
| 24 || November 29 || Ottawa Senators || 4–1 ||  || Bishop || Amalie Arena || 19,204 || 16–6–2 || 34 || 
|-

|- align="center" bgcolor="ccffcc"
| 25 || December 1 || @ New York Rangers || 6–3 ||  || Bishop || Madison Square Garden || 18,006 || 17–6–2 || 36 || 
|- align="center" bgcolor="B0C4DE"
| 26 || December 2 || @ Buffalo Sabres || 1–2 || SO || Nabokov || First Niagara Center || 17,772 || 17–6–3 || 37 || 
|- align="center" bgcolor="ccffcc"
| 27 || December 4 || Buffalo Sabres || 5–0 ||  || Bishop || Amalie Arena || 17,767 || 18–6–3 || 39 || 
|- align="center" bgcolor="ffcccc"
| 28 || December 6 || Columbus Blue Jackets || 1–3 ||  || Bishop || Amalie Arena || 17,467 || 18–7–3 || 39 || 
|- align="center" bgcolor="ffcccc"
| 29 || December 9 || Washington Capitals || 3–5 ||  || Bishop || Amalie Arena || 17,109 || 18–8–3 || 39 || 
|- align="center" bgcolor="ccffcc"
| 30 || December 11 || Carolina Hurricanes || 2–1 ||  || Nabokov || Amalie Arena || 18,104 || 19–8–3 || 41 || 
|- align="center" bgcolor="ffcccc"
| 31 || December 13 || @ Washington Capitals || 2–4 ||  || Bishop || Verizon Center || 18,506 || 19–9–3 || 41 || 
|- align="center" bgcolor="ffcccc"
| 32 || December 15 || @ Pittsburgh Penguins || 2–4 ||  || Nabokov || Consol Energy Center || 18,487 || 19–10–3 || 41 || 
|- align="center" bgcolor="ccffcc"
| 33 || December 16 || @ Philadelphia Flyers || 3–1 ||  || Vasilevskiy || Wells Fargo Center || 19,576 || 20–10–3 || 43 || 
|- align="center" bgcolor="B0C4DE"
| 34 || December 19 || @ New Jersey Devils || 2–3 || SO || Nabokov || Prudential Center || 14,916 || 20–10–4 || 44 || 
|- align="center" bgcolor="ffcccc"
| 35 || December 20 || @ New York Islanders || 1–3 ||  || Vasilevskiy || Nassau Coliseum || 16,170 || 20–11–4 || 44 || 
|- align="center" bgcolor="ccffcc"
| 36 || December 23 || Pittsburgh Penguins || 4–3 ||  || Vasilevskiy || Amalie Arena || 19,204 || 21–11–4 || 46 || 
|- align="center" bgcolor="ccffcc"
| 37 || December 27 || Carolina Hurricanes || 2–1 ||  || Bishop || Amalie Arena || 19,204 || 22–11–4 || 48 || 
|- align="center" bgcolor="ccffcc"
| 38 || December 29 || Toronto Maple Leafs || 3–2 ||  || Bishop || Amalie Arena || 19,204 || 23–11–4 || 50 || 
|- align="center" bgcolor="ccffcc"
| 39 || December 31 || @ Buffalo Sabres || 5–1 ||  || Vasilevskiy || First Niagara Center || 19,070 || 24–11–4 || 52 || 
|-

|- align="center" bgcolor="ffcccc"
| 40 || January 2 || @ Pittsburgh Penguins || 3–6 ||  || Bishop || Consol Energy Center || 18,655 || 24–12–4 || 52 || 
|- align="center" bgcolor="ccffcc"
| 41 || January 4 || @ Ottawa Senators || 4–2 ||  || Bishop || Canadian Tire Centre || 16,949 || 25–12–4 || 54 || 
|- align="center" bgcolor="ccffcc"
| 42 || January 6 || @ Montreal Canadiens || 4–2 ||  || Bishop || Bell Centre || 21,286 || 26–12–4 || 56 || 
|- align="center" bgcolor="ccffcc"
| 43 || January 9 || Buffalo Sabres || 2–1 ||  || Bishop || Amalie Arena || 19,204 || 27–12–4 || 58 || 
|- align="center" bgcolor="ffcccc"
| 44 || January 12 || @ Philadelphia Flyers || 3–7 ||  || Nabokov || Wells Fargo Center || 19,598 || 27–13–4 || 58 || 
|- align="center" bgcolor="ffcccc"
| 45 || January 13 || @ Boston Bruins || 3–4 ||  || Bishop || TD Garden || 17,565 || 27–14–4 || 58 || 
|- align="center" bgcolor="ccffcc"
| 46 || January 15 || Edmonton Oilers || 3–2 ||  || Bishop || Amalie Arena || 18,609 || 28–14–4 || 60 || 
|- align="center" bgcolor="ccffcc"
| 47 || January 17 || Colorado Avalanche || 3–2 || SO || Bishop || Amalie Arena || 19,204 || 29–14–4 || 62 || 
|- align="center" bgcolor="ccffcc"
| 48 || January 20 || Vancouver Canucks || 4–1 ||  || Bishop || Amalie Arena || 18,517 || 30–14–4 || 64 || 
|- align="center" bgcolor="bbbbbb"
| colspan="11"|All-Star Break (January 22–26) 
|- align="center" bgcolor="ffcccc"
| 49 || January 27 || @ Carolina Hurricanes || 2–4 ||  || Bishop || PNC Arena || 12,508 || 30–15–4 || 64 || 
|- align="center" bgcolor="ccffcc"
| 50 || January 29 || Detroit Red Wings || 5–1 ||  || Bishop || Amalie Arena || 19,204 || 31–15–4 || 66 || 
|- align="center" bgcolor="ccffcc"
| 51 || January 31 || Columbus Blue Jackets || 3–1 ||  || Bishop || Amalie Arena || 18,477 || 32–15–4 || 68 || 
|-

|- align="center" bgcolor="B0C4DE"
| 52 || February 3 || @ St. Louis Blues || 1–2 || OT || Bishop || Scottrade Center || 17,223 || 32–15–5 || 69 || 
|- align="center" bgcolor="ccffcc"
| 53 || February 5 || @ Dallas Stars || 5–3 ||  || Vasilevskiy || American Airlines Center || 16,010 || 33–15–5 || 71 || 
|- align="center" bgcolor="ffcccc"
| 54 || February 7 || Los Angeles Kings || 2–4 ||  || Bishop || Amalie Arena || 19,204 || 33–16–5 || 71 || 
|- align="center" bgcolor="ccffcc"
| 55 || February 8 || Anaheim Ducks || 5–3 ||  || Bishop || Amalie Arena || 19,204 || 34–16–5 || 73 || 
|- align="center" bgcolor="B0C4DE"
| 56 || February 10 || @ Nashville Predators || 2–3 || OT || Vasilevskiy || Bridgestone Arena || 16,362 || 34–16–6 || 74 || 
|- align="center" bgcolor="ffcccc"
| 57 || February 12 || St. Louis Blues || 3–6 ||  || Bishop || Amalie Arena || 18,926 || 34–17–6 || 74 || 
|- align="center" bgcolor="ccffcc"
| 58 || February 15 || @ San Jose Sharks || 5–2 ||  || Bishop || SAP Center at San Jose || 17,562 || 35–17–6 || 76 || 
|- align="center" bgcolor="ffcccc"
| 59 || February 16 || @ Los Angeles Kings || 2–3 ||  || Vasilevskiy || Staples Center || 18,230 || 35–17–6 || 76 || 
|- align="center" bgcolor="ccffcc"
| 60 || February 18 || @ Anaheim Ducks || 4–1 ||  || Bishop || Honda Center || 17,284 || 36–17–6 || 78 || 
|- align="center" bgcolor="ccffcc"
| 61 || February 21 || @ Arizona Coyotes || 4–2 ||  || Bishop || Gila River Arena || 12,997 || 37–17–6 || 80 || 
|- align="center" bgcolor="ffcccc"
| 62 || February 22 || @ Colorado Avalanche || 4–5 ||  || Vasilevskiy || Pepsi Center || 17,385 || 37–18–6 || 80 || 
|- align="center" bgcolor="ccffcc"
| 63 || February 27 || Chicago Blackhawks || 4–0 ||  || Bishop || Amalie Arena || 19,204 || 38–18–6 || 82 || 
|-

|- align="center" bgcolor="ffcccc"
| 64 || March 1 || @ Florida Panthers || 3–4 ||  || Bishop || BB&T Center || 10,336 || 38–20–6 || 82 || 
|- align="center" bgcolor="ccffcc"
| 65 || March 3 || Buffalo Sabres || 3–0 ||  || Vasilevskiy || Amalie Arena || 18,922 || 39–20–6 || 84 || 
|- align="center" bgcolor="ccffcc"
| 66 || March 5 || Toronto Maple Leafs || 4–2 ||  || Bishop || Amalie Arena || 19,204 || 40–20–6 || 86 || 
|- align="center" bgcolor="ccffcc"
| 67 || March 7 || Dallas Stars || 5–4 ||  || Vasilevskiy || Amalie Arena || 19,204 || 41–20–6 || 88 || 
|- align="center" bgcolor="ccffcc"
| 68 || March 10 || @ Montreal Canadiens || 1–0 || OT || Bishop || Bell Centre || 21,286 || 42–20–6 || 90 || 
|- align="center" bgcolor="B0C4DE"
| 69 || March 12 || @ Boston Bruins || 2–3 || SO || Bishop || TD Garden || 17,565 || 42–20–7 || 91 || 
|- align="center" bgcolor="ffcccc"
| 70 || March 14 || Winnipeg Jets || 1–2 ||  || Vasilevskiy || Amalie Arena || 19,204 || 42–21–7 || 91 || 
|- align="center" bgcolor="ccffcc"
| 71 || March 16 || Montreal Canadiens || 4–2 ||  || Bishop || Amalie Arena || 19,204 || 43–21–7 || 93 || 
|- align="center" bgcolor="ccffcc"
| 72 || March 20 || Detroit Red Wings || 3–1 ||  || Bishop || Amalie Arena || 19,204 || 44–21–7 || 95 || 
|- align="center" bgcolor="ccffcc"
| 73 || March 22 || Boston Bruins || 5–3 ||  || Bishop || Amalie Arena || 19,204 || 45–21–7 || 97 || 
|- align="center" bgcolor="ccffcc"
| 74 || March 24 || Florida Panthers || 4–3 ||  || Vasilevskiy  || Amalie Arena || 18,729 || 46–21–7 || 99 || 
|- align="center" bgcolor="ffcccc"
| 75 || March 26 || Nashville Predators || 2–3 ||  || Bishop || Amalie Arena || 19,204 || 46–22–7 || 99 || 
|- align="center" bgcolor="ffcccc"
| 76 || March 28 || @ Detroit Red Wings || 0–4 ||  || Bishop || Joe Louis Arena || 20,027 || 46–23–7 || 99 || 
|- align="center" bgcolor="ccffcc"
| 77 || March 30 || @ Montreal Canadiens || 5–3 ||  || Bishop || Bell Centre || 21,286 || 47–23–7 || 101 ||  
|- align="center" bgcolor="ffcccc" 
| 78 || March 31 || @ Toronto Maple Leafs || 1–3 ||  || Vasilevskiy || Air Canada Centre || 18,857 || 47–24–7 || 101 ||    
|-

|- align="center" bgcolor="B0C4DE"
| 79 || April 2 || @ Ottawa Senators || 1–2 || OT || Bishop || Canadian Tire Centre || 18,097 || 47–24–8 || 102 ||  
|- align="center" bgcolor="ccffcc"
| 80 || April 4 || @ Florida Panthers || 4–0 ||  || Bishop || BB&T Center || 11,072 || 48–24–8 || 104 ||  
|- align="center" bgcolor="ccffcc"
| 81 || April 9 || New Jersey Devils || 4–3 || OT || Bishop || Amalie Arena || 19,204 || 49–24–8 || 106 ||  
|- align="center" bgcolor="ccffcc"
| 82 || April 11 || Boston Bruins || 3–2 || SO || Bishop || Amalie Arena || 19,204 || 50–24–8 || 108 ||  
|-

|-
| 2014–15 Schedule
|-
| Lightning score listed first;

Playoffs

|- align="center" bgcolor="ffcccc"
| 1 || April 16 || Detroit Red Wings || 2–3 ||  || Bishop || Amalie Arena || 19,204 || 0–1 || 
|- align="center" bgcolor="ccffcc"
| 2 || April 18 || Detroit Red Wings || 5–1 ||  || Bishop || Amalie Arena || 19,204 || 1–1 || 
|- align="center" bgcolor="ffcccc"
| 3 || April 21 || @ Detroit Red Wings || 0–3 ||  || Bishop || Joe Louis Arena || 20,027 || 1–2 || 
|- align="center" bgcolor="ccffcc"
| 4 || April 23 || @ Detroit Red Wings || 3–2 || 2:25 OT || Bishop || Joe Louis Arena || 20,027 || 2–2 || 
|- align="center" bgcolor="ffcccc"
| 5 || April 25 || Detroit Red Wings || 0–4 ||  || Bishop || Amalie Arena || 19,204 || 2–3 || 
|- align="center" bgcolor="ccffcc"
| 6 || April 27 || @ Detroit Red Wings || 5–2 ||  || Bishop || Joe Louis Arena || 20,027 || 3–3 || 
|- align="center" bgcolor="ccffcc"
| 7 || April 29 || Detroit Red Wings || 2–0 ||  || Bishop || Amalie Arena || 19,204 || 4–3 || 
|-

|- align="center" bgcolor="ccffcc"
| 1 || May 1 || @ Montreal Canadiens || 2–1 || 2:06 2OT || Bishop || Bell Center || 21,287 || 1–0 || 
|- align="center" bgcolor="ccffcc"
| 2 || May 3 || @ Montreal Canadiens || 6–2 ||  || Bishop || Bell Center || 21,287 || 2–0 || 
|- align="center" bgcolor="ccffcc"
| 3 || May 6 || Montreal Canadiens || 2–1 ||  || Bishop || Amalie Arena || 19,204 || 3–0 || 
|- align="center" bgcolor="ffcccc"
| 4 || May 7 || Montreal Canadiens || 2–6 ||  || Bishop || Amalie Arena || 19,204 || 3–1 || 
|- align="center" bgcolor="ffcccc"
| 5 || May 9 || @ Montreal Canadiens || 1–2 ||  || Bishop || Bell Center || 21,287 || 3–2 || 
|- align="center" bgcolor="ccffcc"
| 6 || May 12 || Montreal Canadiens || 4–1 ||  || Bishop || Amalie Arena || 19,204 || 4–2 || 
|-

|- align="center" bgcolor="ffcccc"
| 1 || May 16 || @ New York Rangers || 1–2 ||  || Bishop || Madison Square Garden || 18,006 || 0–1 || 
|- align="center" bgcolor="ccffcc"
| 2 || May 18 || @ New York Rangers || 6–2 ||  || Bishop || Madison Square Garden || 18,006 || 1–1 || 
|- align="center" bgcolor="ccffcc"
| 3 || May 20 || New York Rangers || 6–5 || 3:33 OT || Bishop || Amalie Arena || 19,204 || 2–1 || 
|- align="center" bgcolor="ffcccc"
| 4 || May 22 || New York Rangers || 1–5 ||  || Bishop || Amalie Arena || 19,204 || 2–2 || 
|- align="center" bgcolor="ccffcc"
| 5 || May 24 || @ New York Rangers || 2–0 ||  || Bishop || Madison Square Garden || 18,006 || 3–2 || 
|- align="center" bgcolor="ffcccc"
| 6 || May 26 || New York Rangers || 3–7 ||  || Bishop || Amalie Arena || 19,204 || 3–3 || 
|- align="center" bgcolor="ccffcc"
| 7 || May 29 || @ New York Rangers || 2–0 ||  || Bishop || Madison Square Garden || 18,006 || 4–3 || 
|-

|- align="center" bgcolor="ffcccc"
| 1 || June 3 || Chicago Blackhawks || 1–2 ||  || Bishop || Amalie Arena || 19,204 || 0–1 || 
|- align="center" bgcolor="ccffcc"
| 2 || June 6 || Chicago Blackhawks || 4–3 ||  || Vasilevskiy || Amalie Arena || 19,204 || 1–1 || 
|- align="center" bgcolor="ccffcc"
| 3 || June 8 || @ Chicago Blackhawks || 3–2 ||  || Bishop || United Center || 22,336 || 2–1 || 
|- align="center" bgcolor="ffcccc"
| 4 || June 10 || @ Chicago Blackhawks || 1–2 ||  || Vasilevskiy || United Center || 22,336 || 2–2 || 
|- align="center" bgcolor="ffcccc"
| 5 || June 13 || Chicago Blackhawks || 1–2 ||  || Bishop || Amalie Arena || 19,204 || 2–3 || 
|- align="center" bgcolor="ffcccc"
| 6 || June 15 || @ Chicago Blackhawks || 0–2 ||  || Bishop || United Center || 22,424  || 2–4 ||
|-

|-
| Lightning score listed first;

Player stats
Final stats
Skaters

Goaltenders

†Denotes player spent time with another team before joining Tampa Bay.  Stats reflect time with Tampa Bay only.
‡Traded from Tampa Bay mid-season.
Bold/italics denotes franchise record

Awards and honors

Awards

Milestones

 First in Franchise History

Transactions
The Lightning have been involved in the following transactions during the 2014–15 season.

Trades

Free agents acquired

Free agents lost

Claimed via waivers

Lost via waivers

Lost via retirement

Players released

Player signings

Draft picks

Below are the Tampa Bay Lightning' selections made at the 2014 NHL Entry Draft, held on June 27–28, 2014 at the Wells Fargo Center in Philadelphia. 

Draft notes

 The New York Islanders' second-round pick went to the Tampa Bay Lightning as the result of a trade on June 27, 2014, that sent the Rangers first-round pick in 2014 (28th overall) to New York in exchange for Montreal's second-round pick in 2014 (57th overall) and this pick.
 The Tampa Bay Lightning's second-round pick went to the Los Angeles Kings as the result of a trade on June 28, 2014, that sent Linden Vey to Vancouver in exchange for this pick.
 The Montreal Canadiens' second-round pick went to the Tampa Bay Lightning as the result of a trade on June 27, 2014, that sent the Rangers first-round pick in 2014 (28th overall) to the New York Islanders in exchange for the Islanders second-round pick in 2014 (35th overall) and this pick.      The Islanders previously acquired this pick as the result of a trade on March 5, 2014 that sent Thomas Vanek and a conditional fifth-round pick in 2014 to Montreal in exchange for Sebastian Collberg and this pick (being conditional at the time of the trade). The condition – New York will receive a second-round pick in 2014 if Montreal qualifies for the 2014 Stanley Cup playoffs – was converted on April 1, 2014.
 The Minnesota Wild's third-round pick went to the Tampa Bay Lightning as the result of a trade on June 28, 2014, that sent a third-round pick in 2014 (80th overall) and a seventh-round pick in 2015 to Minnesota in exchange for this pick.
 The Tampa Bay Lightning's third-round pick went to the Minnesota Wild as the result of a trade on June 28, 2014, that sent a third-round pick in 2014 (79th overall) to Tampa Bay in exchange for a seventh-round pick in 2015 and this pick.
 Tampa Bay's fourth-round pick went to St. Louis, as the result of a trade on July 10, 2012, that sent B. J. Crombeen, and a fifth-round pick in 2014 to Tampa Bay in exchange for a fourth-round pick in 2013, and this pick.
 The New York Rangers' fourth-round pick went to the Tampa Bay Lightning as the result of a trade on June 28, 2014, that sent a fifth-round pick in 2014 (140th overall) and St. Louis' fifth-round pick in 2014 (142nd overall) to New York in exchange for this pick.
 The Tampa Bay Lightning's fifth-round pick went to the New York Rangers as the result of a trade on June 28, 2014, that sent a fourth-round pick in 2014 (119th overall) to Tampa Bay in exchange for St. Louis' fifth-round pick in 2014 (142nd overall) and this pick.
 The New York Islanders' seventh-round pick went to the Tampa Bay Lightning as the result of a trade on June 28, 2014, that sent a seventh-round pick in 2014 (200th overall) and a seventh-round pick in 2015 to New York in exchange for this pick.
 The Tampa Bay Lightning's seventh-round pick went to the New York Islanders as the result of a trade on June 28, 2014, that sent a seventh-round pick in 2014 (185th overall) to Tampa Bay in exchange for a seventh-round pick in 2015 and this pick.

References

Tampa Bay Lightning seasons
Tampa
Tampa Bay Lightning season, 2014-15
Eastern Conference (NHL) championship seasons
Tampa
Tamp
Tamp